Mollie Beattie State Forest covers   in Grafton, Vermont in Windham County. The forest is managed by the Vermont Department of Forests, Parks, and Recreation. 

Activities in the forest include walking, snowshoeing, primitive camping and wildlife viewing. The forest is named after Mollie Beattie, an American conservationist and former director of the United States Fish and Wildlife Service.

References

External links
Official website

Vermont state forests
Protected areas of Windham County, Vermont
Grafton, Vermont